Martti Vainaa & Sallitut aineet is a Finnish pop-group that was formed in 2001. It was started as a trio, but in 2005 it had five members. In beginning of the carrier the band made covers, but made own lyrics to them and some adjustments. In its actual format, the group started to make own songs. In 2005 the band made success with its song "Pelimies" (Player) and reached the first place at the Finnish single list during the summer of 2005. The song became a summer hit in Finland in 2005. The song was originally made as a supporter song for the Floorball team Happee and has since appeared in several videos involving Janne Pesonen.

Members
 Max Poster (song/guitar)
 Dan Suker (guitar/background singer)
 Wolf Gustav (basses/background singer)
 Dick Burner (keyboard/background singer)
 Lazy Diamond (drums/background singer)

Discography
 Pakko piikittää (demo, 2002)
 Pelimies / Toyotan takana (single, 6 July 2005)
 Playboy-Hanna (radio-/promosingle, 19 October 2005)
 Onnellinen nyt (album, 2 November 2005)
 Playboy-Hanna / Pelimies 2006 Dance Remix (single, 11 January 2006)
 Toinen nainen / Älä anna rakkaallesi turpaan (single, May 2007)

External links
 Official homepage
 Video for Pelimies at UHO production

Finnish musical groups